The Scoffer is a surviving 1920 American silent drama film produced and directed by Allan Dwan and starring Mary Thurman. It was released through Associated First National Pictures.

Plot
As described in a film magazine, Dr. Stannard Wayne (Kirkwood), a worker for humanity, Dr. Arthur Richards (McCullough), a charlatan, and Carson the Parson (Durning), a missionary worker, are firm friends until a victim of Richards' malpractice dies and Wayne is sentenced to five years imprisonment for the crime. Richards persuades Dr. Wayne's wife to obtain a divorce and marries her. Wayne denounces God and vows never again will he use his ability in the interests of mankind. Released from prison, he finds his way to a northern settlement where Richards and his wife, now a physical wreck, are living. Here he refuses aid to those who are in sickness and misery, and preaches against Divinity. Alice Porn (Mitchell), keeper of the general store, challenges him to prove that man is superior to God by curing a crippled child. After several complications, he begins the operation during a great electrical storm. The elements and his enemies combine to thwart the purpose of the operation, and facing defeat he prays for aid. This aid comes in a form which may or may not be supernatural, as an observer may prefer, and after a time happiness ensues.

Cast
Mary Thurman as Margaret Haddon
James Kirkwood as Dr. Stannard Wayne
Philo McCullough as Dr. Arthur Richards
Rhea Mitchell as Alice Porn
John Burton as Old Dabney
Noah Beery as Boorman
Eugenie Besserer as Boorman's Wife
Georgie Stone as Boorman's son
Bernard Durning as Carson the Parson
Ward Crane as 'The Albany Kid'

Preservation status
A print of The Scoffer is preserved by the Library of Congress.

References

External links

 

1920 films
American silent feature films
Films directed by Allan Dwan
American black-and-white films
Silent American drama films
1920 drama films
1920s American films